Maxïmo Park are an alternative rock band from Newcastle upon Tyne, England. Founded in the city in 2000, the band currently includes Paul Smith (lead vocals), Duncan Lloyd (guitar), and Tom English (drums), with founding members Archis Tiku (bass guitar) and Lukas Wooller (keyboard) retiring in 2014 and 2019 respectively. As of 2022, Maxïmo Park's discography consists of seven studio albums, one live album, two compilation albums, one EP, twenty-three singles and twenty-three music videos.

Maxïmo Park released their debut album, A Certain Trigger in May 2005 on Warp Records. The record was met with considerable critical acclaim, reached a respectable number 15 on the UK Albums Chart, and was certified Gold in the UK. Five different singles were released from the album, with the most successful being "Graffiti", which peaked at number 15 on the UK Singles Chart in May 2005. In January 2006, the group released a compilation album named Missing Songs, which consisted of nine B-sides from A Certain Trigger, as well as demo versions and remixes. The following year, the band released their second effort, Our Earthly Pleasures, which was produced by Gil Norton. The album was released on 2 April 2007 and was preceded by the first single from the record, "Our Velocity". The album was the band's most successful to date, achieving a peak position of number 2 on the UK Albums Chart (as did 2021's Nature Always Wins). The album also received gold certification.

The group released their third studio album, Quicken the Heart on 11 May 2009, and it debuted at number 6 on the UK Albums Chart. The record was their most successful in Switzerland and Germany to date. Two singles were released from the album; "The Kids Are Sick Again", which reached number 50 on the UK Singles Chart, and "Questing, Not Coasting", which failed to chart.

Their seventh album, Nature Always Wins was released in 2021.

Albums

Studio albums

Live albums

Compilation albums

EPs

Singles

Promotional singles

Music videos

Live films

Compilation and soundtrack appearances
A number of Maxïmo Park's songs have been included on compilation discs. Their song "Wasteland" appeared on the War Child album Help!: A Day in the Life in 2005. An acoustic version of their song "Going Missing" was featured on the CD Radio 1's Live Lounge, and their cover of The Proclaimers' "I'm Gonna Be (500 Miles)" was featured in its sequel Radio 1's Live Lounge 2. A cover of Justin Timberlake's "Like I Love You", with a slightly altered, satirical ending referring of Paul growing up in Billingham listening to records, featured on a compilation celebrating BBC Radio 1's 40th Anniversary. An instrumental version of one of the song "Going Missing" appeared as in the film Stranger than Fiction.

The band has also recorded covers of:
 "Just Dance" (Lady Gaga cover)
 "Miss Independent" (Ne-Yo cover)
 "Was There Anything I Could Do?" (The Go-Betweens cover)
 "Diamonds and Pearls" (Prince cover)
 "Shiver" (Natalie Imbruglia cover)

The band's songs have also been featured on numerous video games. Their song "Apply Some Pressure" has appeared on the games Burnout Revenge, SSX on Tour and SingStar Rocks!, whilst "Apply Some Pressure", "Books from Boxes", "The Coast Is Always Changing", "Girls Who Play Guitars", "Going Missing", "Graffiti" and "I Want You to Stay" are all downloadable tracks for SingStar on the PlayStation 3. "Our Velocity" appeared on the demo for Project Gotham Racing 4 and the song "The Unshockable" features on the soundtrack to the game FIFA 08. Their song "Girls Who Play Guitars" is a downloadable track for Rock Band.

Notes

References

Discographies of British artists
Rock music group discographies